Lykke Li is a Swedish singer, songwriter, actress and model. She has appeared in music videos, films and commercials. Li made her acting debut in the 2014 Swedish crime film Tommy, directed by longtime collaborator Tarik Saleh. In 2017, Li starred in Terrence Malick's Song to Song where she played one of Ryan Gosling's love interests. Her song "Gunshot" was used in the television commercial for the Peugeot 108, which stars Li. She also starred in a short film for Gucci's Spring/Summer 2015 collection, which featured her song "Just Like a Dream".

Music videos

As main artist

As featured artist

Commercials

Filmography

Feature films

Short films

Television

Web

References

External links
 

Videographies of Swedish artists